Ephelis sudanalis is a moth in the family Crambidae. It is found in Sudan.

References

Moths described in 1917
Odontiini